Jean Le Garrec (9 August 1929 – 19 February 2023) was a French businessman and politician of the Socialist Party (PS).

Biography
Born in Le Palais on 9 August 1929, Le Garrec was initially a member of the Unified Socialist Party. In 1974, he followed Michel Rocard to the PS. In 1981, he was elected to the National Assembly in Nord's 16th constituency. On 23 June 1981, he was appointed Secretary of State in Charge of Nationalizations. He was elected again to the National Assembly in 1986 for the Nord department via proportional representation. He was re-elected in 1988 to represent Nord's 18th constituency. He lost his mandate in 1993 but returned in 1997 in Nord's 12th constituency. He was re-elected in 2002.

In addition to his legislative career, Le Garrec participated in the Club Réformer, a political think tank, alongside Martine Aubry, Marylise Lebranchu, François Lamy, and Adeline Hazan. In 2006, he announced he would not stand for re-election the following year. He was succeeded by Christian Hutin.

Jean Le Garrec died on 19 February 2023, at the age of 93.

Distinctions
Knight of the Legion of Honour (2011)

Publications
Une vie à gauche (2006)
Trois femmes (2011)

References

1929 births
2023 deaths
Unified Socialist Party (France) politicians
Deputies of the 7th National Assembly of the French Fifth Republic
Deputies of the 8th National Assembly of the French Fifth Republic
Deputies of the 9th National Assembly of the French Fifth Republic
Deputies of the 11th National Assembly of the French Fifth Republic
Deputies of the 12th National Assembly of the French Fifth Republic
Members of Parliament for Nord
French Ministers of Civil Service
Chevaliers of the Légion d'honneur